The Wełna (German: Welna, also Kleine Warthe) is a river in west-central Poland, a right tributary of the Warta river, with a length of 118 kilometres and a basin area of 2,635 km2. Its source is near Gniezno, it passes through Janowiec Wielkopolski, Wągrowiec and Rogoźno, and it flows into the Warta near Oborniki.

See also

 Rivers of Poland

References

Rivers of Poland
Rivers of Greater Poland Voivodeship